Adelaide Street, Fremantle is a street that is a boundary for Kings Square, Fremantle in Western Australia.
It goes north from Kings Square and meets Queen Victoria Street in a skewed junction that meets outside St Patrick's Basilica.

It is named after Queen Adelaide, consort of William IV. The street existed since at least 1833, when it was included in a survey.

At number 3 is St John's Anglican Church which dates from 1882.

It has on its western side, the Film and Television Institute, and Princess May Park.

Johnson Court Apartments, at number 23 Adelaide Street are one of the earlier high rise apartment buildings of Fremantle.

See also

Notes

 

 
Streets in Fremantle
Articles containing video clips